Ischnocampa insitivum is a moth of the family Erebidae. It was described by Max Wilhelm Karl Draudt in 1917. It is found in Colombia.

References

 

Insitivum
Moths described in 1917